Coniston railway station may refer to:

 Coniston railway station (England)
 Coniston railway station, New South Wales